Jeotgalicoccus coquinae is a species of bacteria in the family Staphylococcaceae. A strain of this species was found during a microbiological examination of poultry houses. It was originally isolated from coquina, which is used as a food supplement for female ducks. Jeotgalicoccus coquinae is closely related to Jeotgalicoccus psychrophilus.

The shape of the cells is coccoid with 1.5–2.0 μm in diameter. Jeotgalicoccus coquinae is part of the Gram-positive bacteria. The Oxidase test as well as the Catalase test is positive, revealing an aerobic respiratory metabolism.

References

External links
Type strain of Jeotgalicoccus coquinae at BacDive -  the Bacterial Diversity Metadatabase

coquinae
Bacteria described in 2011